Keir  or  Kier  is a Gaelic name derived from Ciar. Notable people with the name include:

Surname
Andrew Keir (1926–1997), Scottish actor
Colin Keir (born 1959), Scottish politician
David Keir (1884–1971), British actor
David Lindsay Keir (1895–1973), British historian
Jack Keir, Canadian politician
James Keir (1735–1820), Scottish scientist
John Keir (1856–1937), British Army officer 
Leitch Keir, Scottish footballer
Nick Keir (born 1953), Scottish musician

Given name
Keir Clark (1910–2010), Canadian politician
Keir Dillon (born 1977), American snowboarder
Keir Dullea (born 1936), American actor
Keir Gilchrist (born 1992), Canadian actor
Keir Giles, (born 1968), British writer
Keir Graff (born 1969), American writer
Keir Hardie (1856–1915), Scottish socialist, first leader of the UK Labour Party
Keir Nuttall, Australian musician
Keir O'Donnell (born 1978), Australian actor
Keir Pearson (born 1966), American screenwriter
Keir Simmons (born 1972), British journalist
Sir Keir Starmer (born 1962), British barrister, human rights lawyer, former Director of Public Prosecutions and head of the Crown Prosecution Service, and leader of the UK Labour Party since 2020
Keir Thomas (born 1998), American football player

References